Brian George Charles Huggett,  (born 18 November 1936) is a Welsh professional golfer. He won sixteen events on the European circuit, including two after the formal start of the European Tour in 1972. In 1968 he won the Harry Vardon Trophy for leading the Order of Merit. He played in the Ryder Cup six times and was a non-playing captain. He also won 10 times on the European Seniors Tour between 1992 and 2000, including the 1998 Senior British Open.

Early life
Huggett born in Porthcawl, Wales, the son of George Huggett, who was the professional at Royal Porthcawl Golf Club. He had a younger brother Geoff who also became a professional golfer. After World War II, George was the professional at Neath Golf Club before moving to Redhill and Reigate Golf Club, in Surrey, in 1950.

Professional career
Huggett turned professional in 1951, becoming an assistant to his father at Redhill and Reigate, but it wasn't until 1962 that he won his first important individual event, the Dutch Open. He had been runner-up the previous year. Earlier in 1962, he had finished tied for third in the Open Championship, albeit a full 13 shots behind runaway winner Arnold Palmer. Huggett had two more wins in 1963, the Cox Moore Tournament and the German Open. He qualified for the 1963 Ryder Cup team and, although the United States won 23 to 9, Huggett was the leading British scorer, with 2 wins and a half.

After his successes in 1962 and 1963, Huggett struggled for success from 1964 to 1966, a period that coincided with the introduction of the bigger ball in many tournaments. During this period he was, however, joint runner-up in the 1965 Open Championship at Royal Birkdale, an event played with the smaller ball. He finished two shots behind Australia's Peter Thomson.

Huggett returned to form in 1967, winning the PGA Close Championship and the Martini International in successive weeks, although he tied the Martini International with Malcolm Gregson. From 1968 to 1970 he was regular winner. In 1968, he won the Harry Vardon Trophy for leading the Order of Merit and played in the Piccadilly World Match Play Championship, losing to Arnold Palmer at the 36th hole. In 1970, Huggett was ranked 10th in the world in McCormack's World Golf Rankings, the forerunner of the modern Official World Golf Ranking. The rankings were based on a 3-year period and his high ranking reflected these tournament wins.

From 1971, his wins became less frequent. He was joint winner of the 1971 Daks Tournament with Neil Coles and won twice on the European Tour, in 1974 and 1978. He was the third-highest money winner in 1972, the first season of the European Tour.

Huggett played six times for Great Britain and Ireland in the Ryder Cup (1963, 1967, 1969, 1971, 1973 and 1975) and had a 9–10–6 win–loss–half record, despite never being on a winning team. He is remembered for an incident in the 1969 Ryder Cup, a match that was tied at 16 points each. Playing the 18th hole in the last-but-one match, he holed a putt to halve his match with Billy Casper. Just before making his putt he had heard a loud roar from the 17th green, where Tony Jacklin was playing Jack Nicklaus. Believing that Jacklin had beaten Nicklaus he thought that his putt had won the Ryder Cup. Only after leaving the green did he find out the Jacklin/Nicklaus match was still being played. Huggett was also Great Britain & Ireland's non-playing captain in 1977 and represented Wales nine times in the World Cup between 1963 and 1979. He played in the Open Championship 19 successive times between 1961 and 1979.

Huggett joined the European Seniors Tour when it debuted in 1992 and, despite being 55 when the tour started, won 10 times on the tour between 1992 and 2000, including the 1993 PGA Seniors Championship and the 1998 Senior British Open. He finished second on the European Seniors Tour Order of Merit in 1993, 1994 and 1998. 

Huggett has also been a golf-course designer. He was appointed a Member of the Order of the British Empire (MBE) in the 1978 Birthday Honours for services to golf, and in 2006 was inducted into the Welsh Sports Hall of Fame.

Professional wins (34)

European Tour wins (2)

European Tour playoff record (0–1)

Great Britain and Ireland wins (11)

Continental Europe wins (3)

Other wins (8)
1957 Sunningdale Foursomes (with Ross Whitehead)
1961 Gleneagles Hotel Foursomes Tournament (with Martin Christmas)
1965 Smart Weston Tournament, Gleneagles Hotel Foursomes Tournament (with Michael Burgess)
1968 Shell Winter Tournament
1969 Turnberry-B.O.A.C. Foursomes Tournament (with Colin Cowdrey)
1972 Sumrie Better-Ball (with Malcolm Gregson)
1978 Welsh Professional Championship

Senior PGA Tour wins (1)

Senior PGA Tour playoff record (1–0)

European Senior Tour wins (10)

European Senior Tour playoff record (6–1)

Results in major championships

CUT = missed the half-way cut (3rd round cut in 1973, 1974 and 1978 Open Championships)
"T" indicates a tie for a place
Note: Huggett never played in the U.S. Open or PGA Championship.

Senior major championships

Wins (1)

1Defeated Polland with a par at the first hole of a sudden-death playoff.

Team appearances
Professional
Ryder Cup (representing Great Britain and Ireland): 1963, 1967, 1969, 1971, 1973, 1975, 1977 (non-playing captain)
World Cup (representing Wales): 1963, 1964, 1965, 1968, 1969, 1970, 1971, 1976, 1979
R.T.V. International Trophy (representing Wales): 1967
Double Diamond International (representing Wales): 1971, 1972, 1973, 1974 (captain), 1975, 1976, 1977 (captain)
Marlboro Nations' Cup (representing Wales): 1972, 1973
Sotogrande Match/Hennessy Cognac Cup (representing Great Britain and Ireland): 1974 (winners, captain), 1978 (winners, captain)
Praia d'El Rey European Cup: 1998 (tie)

See also
List of golfers with most European Senior Tour wins

References

External links

Welsh male golfers
European Tour golfers
European Senior Tour golfers
Ryder Cup competitors for Europe
Winners of senior major golf championships
Members of the Order of the British Empire
People from Porthcawl
Sportspeople from Bridgend County Borough
People from Ross-on-Wye
1936 births
Living people